The 1895 American Cup was the eleventh edition of the soccer tournament organized by the American Football Association. The Newark Caledonians brought the trophy back to New Jersey for the first time since 1887 by winning 4–0 against the Pawtucket Free Wanderers in the final. This season the elected committee was Samuel Worthington as president, Thomas Burke as vice president, William Robertson as Secretary, and Alexander Micklejohn as Treasurer. The committee chose the Thomlinson football to be the official ball for use in all cup games. This was the first occasion a steam ship team was admitted to the competition. Players from the Teutonic of the White Star line were placed in the western division. The American League of Professional Football began play this season just two weeks prior to the American Cup's opening round. However, in order to protect itself, the AFA barred players from joining the association who had already signed contacts with the ALPF. The National Association Football League also began its first season in March. The only AFA club to participate in the NAFBL, the Centrevilles of Bayonne, were the first champions.

Participants

Western Clubs:
 Centreville A.C.Bayonne, New Jersey (NAFBL)
 CaledoniansNewark, New Jersey
 True BluesPaterson, New Jersey
 Union A.C.Kearny, New Jersey
 White Star A.C.Teutonic S.S.

Eastern Clubs:
 East EndsFall River, Massachusetts (NEL)
 OlympicsFall River, Massachusetts (NEL)
 RoversFall River, Massachusetts (NEL)
 Free WanderersPawtucket, Rhode Island (NEL)
 Young Men's Christian AssociationPawtucket, Rhode Island (NEL)

First round
The first round draw took place at the AFA meeting at Newark, New Jersey on September 15, 1894. The games of the first round were scheduled to be played on or before November 10. Caledonians and East Ends drew byes. The Free Wanderers-Olympics match was protested on account of ineligible players and ordered replayed.

Y.M.C.A.: GK Duncan McFarlane, FB Hamilton Walmsley, J.Paterson, HB Frank Schora, Alexander Meiklejohn, Bert McLay, LW William James, Alexander Morrison, RW William Cameron, Whiteside, C John Ellison. Rovers: GK Simester, FB Ormonde, Harry Adams, HB Lang, Hancock, Hughes, LW Pearson, Mitchell, RW Boner, Melia, C G.Fogarty.

True Blues: GK Hall, FB Alexander, F.Binks, HB R.Garner, Ackerman, Joe Upton, FW O'Neil, Inghram, Phillbin, Turner, Oldfield. Greenpoint: GK Hormby, FB Holmes, Kelly, HB Murphy, Tibble, Whitinds, FW Cromie, Robinson, Smith, Platts, Dumbell.

Free Wanderers: G Hannaway, FB Walmsley, Whipple, HB Billy Read, Jimmy Johnson, Daley, RW Leggett, Hutchinson, LW Hunt, Peter Lyons, C Johnston. Olympics: GK Cyr, FB Burgess, Morris, HB Hayes, Moore, Jean, RW Miller, Drouge, LW Andrews, Murphy, C King.

replay 

Free Wanderers: G Hannaway, FB Israel Whipple, Thomas Walmsley, HB William Reed, James Johnson, Daly, RW Robert Hutchinson, Leggett, LW James Hunt, William Adams, C Johnson. Olympics: GK Greenwood, FB S.Burgess, Moore, HB T.Hayes, Drouge, Jean, RW Miller, Randall, LW Andrews, Slater, C Bright, Reserve- P.King.

Second round
The Free Wanderers and True Blues drew a second round bye. The Union-Caledonian game was protested and ordered replayed.

Union: GK Smith, FB Dockery, Stewart, HB Partington, Cutler, Singleton, FW Hauser, McGee, Sanson, Hill, Williams. Caledonians: GK Glynn, FB McCance, McDonald, HB, Britchford, Brown, Swithenby, FW McKinley, Spencer, Naglee, Taylor, McAuley.

East Ends: GK Frank Cornell, FB Joe Buckley, Heywood, HB Beattie, P.Stanton, Hussey, RW Hargraves, Ernest Leveque, LW Smith, Taylor, C Carroll, Reserves Taylor, Bradshaw, J.Constantine. Y.M.C.A.: GK McFarlane, FB Ellison, Paterson, HB William Moore, Meiklejohn, Schora, LW James, A.Morrison, C McLay, RW McNeil, Watson.

replay 

Union: GK Smith, FB Dockray, Holden, HB Partington, Parlington, Singleton, LW Hood, McGhee, C Sampson, RW McCullagh, Douglass. Caledonians: GK Glyn, FB McCamp, Dawson, HB, McDonald, Finlay, Swithemby, LW McCullough, Taylor, C Sagass, RW Spencer, McKinley.

Semifinals 

Caledonians: GK W.Glynn, FB J.McCance, M.Dawson, HB R.Swithemby, S.Finley, F.McDonald, FW M.McCawley, W.Taylor, J.Nagle, R.Spencer, J.McKinley. True Blues: GK S.Simnpson, FB W.Alexander, H.McCrowe, HB E.Ackerman, Ralph Hall, J.Upton, FW E.Groocock, J.Inghram, C Tom Phillibin, LW J.Oldfield, T.Turner.

replays 

Y.M.C.A.: GK Duncan McFarlane, FB John Ellison, J.Paterson, HB Hamilton Walmsley, William Moore, Bert McLay, LW William James, Alexander Morrison, RW Frank Schora, Watson, C Alexander Meiklejohn. Free Wanderers: GK Adams, FB Israel Whipple, Mackie, HB William Reed, James Johnson, Thomas Walmsley, RW Robert Hutchinson, Leggett, LW James Hunt, Lyon, C Johnson.

Caledonians: GK W.Glynn, FB J.McCance, M.Dawson, HB R.Swithemby, S.Finley, F.McDonald, FW M.McCawley, W.Taylor, J.Nagle, R.Spencer, J.McKinley. True Blues: GK S.Simnpson, FB W.Alexander, H.McCrowe, HB E.Ackerman, Ralph Hall, J.Upton, FW E.Groocock, J.Inghram, C Tom Phillibin, LW J.Oldfield, T.Turner.

Final 

Free Wanderers: GK Adams, FB Israel Whipple, Gregory, HB William Reed, L.Johnson, Thomas Walmsley, RW F.Johnson, Leggett, RW James Hunt, Lyons, C Robert Hutchinson. Caledonians: GK W.Glynn, FB J.McCance, M.Dawson, HB R.Swithemby, S.Finley, F.McDonald, FW M.McCauley, W.Taylor, J.Nagle, Robert Spencer, J.McKinley.

References 

1895